Ganga and Jamuna Shreshta were a pair of Nepali conjoined twins who underwent surgery in Singapore to separate them in 2001. 

The Shreshta twins were born in the town of Khalanga in western Nepal, and named for India's sacred rivers.  Their surgery took more than 100 hours, triple the previous record and was made possible by advanced computer imaging which had never been used before in Singapore. Although both survived the surgery, believed to be only the second of its kind, they had varying degrees of impairment. Ganga subsequently died in 2008 of pneumonia and meningitis.

In 2016, a book was published in Singapore about their lives.

References

Conjoined twins
2000 births
2008 deaths
Living people